Enes Meral (born 28 July 2000), better known by his stage name Mero, is a German-Turkish rapper. He rose to prominence in 2018 on Instagram and his debut single "Baller los", which debuted at the top of the German and Austrian single charts. His follow-up singles "Hobby Hobby" and "Wolke 10" also topped the German and Austrian charts. In 2019, he was featured in the hits "Ferrari" by Eno and in "Kein Plan" by Loredana both topping the German chart. Mero has released three albums: Ya Hero Ya Mero and Unikat in 2019 and Seele in 2020.

Life and career 
Enes Meral was born and raised in Rüsselsheim am Main, Germany and is of Turkish descent. He started posting videos filmed on a mobile phone where he is rapping on Instagram in 2016. He built a large following and was later signed by rapper Xatar and Groove Attack. His debut single "Baller los" was released on 22 November 2018. The single became an immediate success and reached the top of the German and Austrian single chart. His second single "Hobby Hobby" was released on 17 January 2019 and became the first German rap track to reach the Spotify 200. It again reached the top of the German single charts in end of January 2019. It broke the records for most streams in one day and one week. He released his first album Ya Hero Ya Mero on 15 March 2019 which has 12 tracks and his second album Unikat on 27 September 2019 which has 14 tracks.

Discography

Studio albums

Singles

As lead artist

As featured artist

Other charted songs

Music videos

Awards and nominations

References 

2000 births
German rappers
Living people
German people of Turkish descent
German lyricists
German songwriters
People from Gümüşhane